Nectamia annularis, also known as the tailring cardinalfish, is a marine fish belonging to the family Apogonidae or also called cardinalfishes.

Description
Tailring cardinalfish is a small sized fish which grows up to 7 cm. Its body has an elongate appearance, compressed laterally and with a round profile.
It has two translucide dorsal fins, one lateral line, a large mouth and big round eyes.
Its body coloration is silver grey with a black ring around the caudal peduncle.

Distribution & habitat
This species is found in tropical waters of the western part of the Indian Ocean, including the Red Sea, the Gulf of Aden and also the Maldives. They are found in shallow water near coral reefs up to  depth.

Feeding
Nectamia annularis is a zooplankton-eater.

Behaviour
Tailring cardinalfish is a nocturnal species which when feeding, may be solitary or gather in small groups in shallow water above the coral reef. During daytime, they usually hide in reef crevices and caves.

References

External links
http://www.marinespecies.org/aphia.php?p=taxdetails&id=398503
 

annularis
Fish described in 1829